Niccolò Macii (born 18 October 1995) is an Italian pair skater. With his skating partner, Sara Conti, he is the 2023 European champion, the 2022–23 Grand Prix Final bronze medalist, the 2022 MK John Wilson Trophy silver medalist, the 2022 Skate Canada International bronze medalist, 2023 Italian national champion, and a three-time Italian national bronze medalist (2020–2022).  They are the first (and to date, only) Italian pair to win gold at the European Championships.

With his former skating partner, Bianca Manacorda, he won silver at an ISU Challenger Series event, the 2014 Lombardia Trophy, and placed 12th at the 2016 European Championships in Bratislava, Slovakia. They also competed at three World Junior Championships, achieving their best result, 6th, at the 2016 event in Debrecen, Hungary.

Programs 
 With Conti

 With Manacorda

Competitive highlights 
GP: Grand Prix; CS: Challenger Series; JGP: Junior Grand Prix

With Conti

With Manacorda

Detailed results 
ISU Personal best in bold.

 With Conti

References

External links 
 

1995 births
Italian male pair skaters
Living people
Figure skaters from Milan